Candy Candy is a 1976 to 1979 Japanese anime television series based on Kyoko Mizuki manga series of the same name. The animated series was produced by Toei Animation. The series was first broadcast in Japan by TV Asahi from 1 October 1976 to 2 February 1979. Two pieces of theme music sung by Mitsuko Horie are used through the entire series. The opening theme is "Candy Candy" (キャンディ キャンディ) and the closing ending theme is "Ashita ga Suki" (あしたがすき).

In 1980, ZIV International acquired the U.S. rights to the series. The first two episodes were dubbed into English, with a new theme song and score created by in-house composer Mark Mercury. This was ultimately condensed into a straight-to-video production, released on tape in 1981 by Media Home Entertainment and then by Family Home Entertainment. It is unknown if any more episodes were dubbed for the American market. None of these have been subsequently reissued.

Episode list

Fall 1976

Winter 1976–77

Spring 1977

Summer 1977

Fall 1977

Winter 1977–78

Spring 1978

Summer 1978

Fall 1978

Winter 1978–1979 

Candy Candy